Tor Tank-Nielsen (9 July 1918 – 8 March 2010) was a Norwegian businessperson.

He was born in Kristiania. He studied chemical engineering, and graduated in 1940. In 1941 he was hired in the company M. Peterson & Søn, and after a series of promotions he became CEO in 1981.

He is one of two honorary members in the Industrial Association of the city of Moss, the other one being Erik Mollatt.

References

1918 births
2010 deaths
People from Moss, Norway
20th-century Norwegian engineers
20th-century Norwegian businesspeople